The swimming competition at the 1987 Mediterranean Games was held in Latakia,  Syria.

Medallists

Men's events

Women's events

Medal table

References
International Mediterranean Games Committee

Mediterranean Games
Sports at the 1987 Mediterranean Games
1987